Tol-e Pir (also Romanized as Tol-e Pīr) is a village in Rostam-e Yek Rural District, in the Central District of Rostam County, Fars Province, Iran. At the 2006 census, its population was 132, in 26 families.

References 

Populated places in Rostam County